The Rotax 275 is a , single-cylinder, two-stroke aircraft engine, built by BRP-Rotax GmbH & Co. KG of Austria for use in Self-launched Gliders.

Design
The Rotax 275 is a single-cylinder two-stroke engine with an air-cooled cylinder head and cylinder. It has a single magneto ignition with a gear driven propeller. It was certified in Austria in November 1988.

Applications
 Glaser-Dirks DG-600M
 Schleicher ASH 25E
 Schleicher ASW 24E

Specifications (275)

References

Air-cooled aircraft piston engines
Rotax engines
Two-stroke aircraft piston engines